The statues of Pegasus are installed outside Mexico City's Palacio de Bellas Artes, in Mexico. The four sculptures were designed by Spanish artist Agustí Querol Subirats.

History
The sculptures arrived from Spain to Veracruz in 1911 and were installed on each of the four corners of the roof of the National Theater until 1921. They were then moved to the Zócalo (Plaza of the Constitution) in 1922 and installed on large marble bases at four corners of the garden in the square. Then in 1933, they were moved once again and installed in front of the Palacio de Bellas Artes.

See also
 Pegasus in popular culture

References

External links
 

Historic center of Mexico City
Horses in art
Outdoor sculptures in Mexico City
Pegasus in popular culture
Statues in Mexico City
Bronze sculptures in Mexico